Jabal al Gharbi or The Western Mountain ( Al Ǧabal al Gharbi) is one of the districts of Libya. It is named after the Nafusa Mountains. It was formed in 2007 from the former districts of Yafran, Gharyan and Mizda.  From 1995 to 1998 Jabal al Gharbi also existed as a Baladiyah. Jabal al Gharbi borders Sirte and Misrata to the east, Murqub to the northeast, Jafara and Zawiya to the north, Nuqat al Khams to the northwest, Nalut to the west, Tripoli to the north, Wadi al Shatii to the south and  Jufra to the southeast.

Per the census of 2012, the total population in the region was 157,747 with 150,353 Libyans. The average size of the household in the country was 6.9, while the average household size of non-Libyans being 3.7. There were totally 22,713 households in the district, with 20,907 Libyan ones.  The population density of the district was 1.86 persons per km2.
Per 2006 census, there were totally 104,584 economically active people in the district.

Geography

Around 91 per cent of the land is covered by desert, with only 8.8 per cent agricultural land (with only 1% arable lands) and 0.1 per cent of forests. The major resources are petroleum, gypsum and natural gas. Along the coastal regions, the climate is Mediterranean in coastal areas, while it is desert climate in all other parts. Dust storms lasting four to eight days is pretty common during Spring. Triplotania is the northwest region, while it is Cyrenacia in the east and Fezzen in southwest. There are no perennial rivers in the region, but the region is abundant with groundwater aquifers. Most of the major cities of Libya are located in the coastal regions.

Demographics
Per the census of 2012, the total population in the region was 157,747 with 150,353 Libyans. The average size of the household in the country was 6.9, while the average household size of non-Libyans being 3.7. There were totally 22,713 households in the district, with 20,907 Libyan ones.  The population density of the district was 1.86 persons per km2. Per 2006 census, there were totally 104,584 economically active people in the district. There were 55,257 government employees, 9,638 employers, 36,074 first level workers and 008 second level workers. There were 18,322 workers in state administration, 10,413 in agriculture, animal husbandry and forestry, 11,065 in agriculture & hunting, 31,371 in education, 8,390 in private enterprises, 4,344 in health & social work, 7,725 in production, 30,421 in technical work and 1,221 service workers. The total enrollment in schools was 98,685 and the number of people above secondary stage and less than graduation was 5,002.
As per the report from World Health Organization (WHO), there were 1 communicable disease centres, 4 dental clinics, 1 general clinics, 0 in-patient clinics, 11 out-patient clinics, 42 pharmacies, 58 PHC centres, 3 polyclinics, 2 rural clinics and 1 specialized clinics. Islam is the state and major religion of the country.

Administration
Libya became independent in 1951 from the colonial empire and generally known for its oil rich resources. All the powers rested centrally with the president, Gaddafi, for 42 years till the 2011 armed rebellion which toppled him. As per the constitution, Libya is the most decentralized Arab nation, but practically all powers are vested on central government on account of control over the oil revenues. Local governmental institutions manage the administration of education, industry, and communities. As a part of decentralization in 2012, the country is administratively split into 13 regions from the original 25 municipalities, which were further divided in 1,500 communes. Since 2015, the chief of the state is a chairman of Presidential Council, while the prime minister is the head of the state. The House of Representatives is an elected body that is elected on universal suffrage and popular vote. As of 2016, there were 22 administrative divisions in the country in the form of districts.

References

 

 
Jabal
+